SpectreRF is an option to the Spectre Circuit Simulator from Cadence Design Systems. It adds a series of analyses that are particularly useful for RF circuits to the basic capabilities of Spectre.  SpectreRF was first released in 1996 and was notable for three reasons. First, it was arguably the first RF simulator in that it was the first to be designed for large bipolar and CMOS RF circuits; it used shooting methods as its base algorithm; and it pioneered the use of Krylov subspace methods. The use of shooting methods gave SpectreRF remarkable robustness and the Krylov methods gave it capacity that was roughly 100 times greater than existing simulators at the time. Previously such simulators were designed to simulate very small GaAs integrated circuits and hybrids. These simulators were based on harmonic balance and could reliably simulate circuits with tens of transistors whereas SpectreRF could simulate circuits with thousands of transistors.

SpectreRF added the Periodic Steady State and Periodic small-signal analyses to Spectre. The Periodic Steady-State or PSS analysis directly computed the periodic steady-state response of a circuit. The periodic small-signal analyses use the periodic steady-state solution as a periodically time-varying operating point and linearize the circuit about that operating point and then computes the response of the circuit to small perturbation sources. Effectively they build a periodically time-varying linear model of the circuit. This is significant as periodically time-varying linear models, unlike the time-invariant linear models used by the traditional small-signal analyses (AC and noise) exhibit frequency conversion. SpectreRF pioneered a variety of periodic small-signal analyses, including periodic AC (pac), periodic noise (pnoise), periodic transfer function, periodic s-parameter (psp) and periodic stability (pstb).

After its introduction, SpectreRF quickly became the dominant simulator for RF integrated circuits, and was instrumental in establishing Spectre as the most popular circuit simulator for integrated circuits. Eventually the dominance of SpectreRF faded as the use of Krylov subspace methods propagated to other simulators, particularly those based on harmonic balance. SpectreRF now provides harmonic balance in addition to shooting methods, both of which are accelerated using Krylov subspace methods.

SpectreRF was developed by Ken Kundert, Jacob White, and Ricardo Telichevesky.

References

Electronic circuit simulators